Be Best was a public-awareness campaign promoted by Melania Trump, former first lady of the United States, focusing on well-being for youth and advocating against cyberbullying.

Campaign 
Melania Trump made the initiative and came up with the name "Be Best".  Trump said she was prepared for criticism. She formally introduced the campaign on May 7, 2018. Following her speech in the White House Rose Garden, President Donald Trump signed a proclamation declaring May 7 "Be Best" day. Unlike policy initiatives by previous first ladies (such as Michelle Obama's Let's Move! campaign against childhood obesity, or Nancy Reagan's Just Say No to drugs campaign), Be Best is broad in scope. The initiative focuses on physical and emotional well-being, and also advocates against cyberbullying and opioid abuse.

The initiative began with a very slow start, as Trump underwent kidney surgery one week after the campaign was launched. She made no public appearances for the next several weeks. On July 24, 2018, she visited the Monroe Carell Jr. Children's Hospital at Vanderbilt in Nashville, Tennessee and talked about children with neonatal withdrawal. On August 6, 2018, she tweeted: "It's #Backtoschool for many youth this month. As you begin a new year, how will you be the best you? #BeBest". She spoke at a cyberbullying summit outside Washington, D.C. on August 20, 2018.

During the initiative's first year, she also promoted Be Best in-person at events in Oklahoma, Washington state, and Nevada. She also promoted Be Best abroad in trips to Ghana, Malawi, Kenya, and Egypt.

Criticism 
The campaign was accompanied by a booklet that was promoted as having been written "by First Lady Melania Trump." Accusations of plagiarism accrued, to which her office responded by admonishing the press for reporting on the issue. Following the plagiarism accusations the White House's website changed the copy to read "a Federal Trade Commission booklet, promoted by First Lady Melania Trump". The fact-checking site Snopes found the charge of plagiarism "Mostly False", saying: "Melania Trump did not claim she had written the pamphlet herself, and she contributed an introduction to a slightly revised version of the booklet. The FTC was always credited for the creation of the booklet and supported its inclusion in the First Lady's "Be Best" campaign."

The slogan "Be Best" has also been criticized for having an apparent grammatical error, as it is missing a definite article, and should read as, "Be the Best." The Guardian noted Mrs. Trump's native language, Slovenian, does not use definite articles, and speculated whether the name constituted one-upmanship after Michelle Obama's call to "Be Better". Mrs. Trump's senior adviser, Stephanie Winston Wolkoff, called the slogan "illiterate" and pushed for an alternative slogan, "Children First", which the First Lady rejected due to the similarities with her husband's "America First" branding.

On December 12, 2019, Melania Trump's 'Be Best' hashtag trended on Twitter after the President sent a critical tweet directed to then 16-year-old climate activist Greta Thunberg. Several media outlets noted that Melania Trump criticized legal expert Pamela Karlan the previous week after Karlan mentioned the Trumps' teenage son, Barron, during testimony as part of the then ongoing impeachment inquiry.

References

External links

 

2018 introductions
Anti-bullying campaigns
Cyberbullying
Plagiarism controversies
Presidency of Donald Trump
Public awareness campaigns
Well-being